Stickup is a robbery at gunpoint.

Stick-Up may also refer to:
 "Stick-Up", a song by Honey Cone
 Stick-Up!, an album by Bobby Hutcherson